Russian grain export - foreign trade operations for the sale of grain, primarily wheat grain to other countries, a traditional item of export income for Russia for centuries, providing the Russian Federation in the 21st century with leadership among the main grain suppliers to the world market along with the EU (2nd place 2019/20), United States (3rd place), Canada (4th place), Ukraine (5th place).

Political aspects 
Historically, Russian wheat exports were preceded by wheat exports from the Black Sea steppes to Ancient Greece and Ancient Rome. The long existence of grain exports in this direction is associated with the peculiarities of the landscape of the Northern Black Sea region, which are extremely favorable for the growth of wheat.

Grain export of Russia for a long time had not only economic, but also significant external and internal political importance for the country. It became the subject of public discussion and political speculation in various historical periods of the country's life. Since wheat has been one of the main Russian export goods for a long time, the proceeds from its sale were often used for cross-financing of other sectors of the economy, primarily industry.

At the same time, the average yield grain in the risky farming zone (80% of the Russian territory)  is low: self-three instead of self-six, self-seven in Western and Southern Europe.

Due to the difference in natural and geographical conditions in Eastern Europe, the aggregate of the most necessary needs of an individual was significantly greater than in Western Europe, and the conditions for their satisfaction are much more difficult and worse, noted the author of the book "Great Russian Plowman" L.V. Milov. Therefore, the volume of the surplus product of grain production was always much less, and with the need of landowners to receive incomes comparable to incomes in Western European societies, they obviously gave rise to the catch phrase attributed to the Minister of Finance of the Russian Empire Vyshnegradskiy "we are undernourished, but we will take out!".

Historical background

Russian Empire grain exports

USSR grain exports 
International grain trade by the USSR was handled by the state monopoly corporation Exportkhleb.

Russian Federation grain exports

State participation 
After the USSR liquidation, the Russian state did not set itself the explicit task of participating in grain exports, however, quite early it tried to enter the grain market with the officially declared goals of supporting domestic producers and food security, ensuring public food purchases and organizing markets. The latter also meant the grain trade market, including for export. Work in this direction has been consistently delegated by the state to a number of organizational successive structures:

    In October 1994, for these purposes, the Federal Food Corporation was created under the Ministry of Agriculture and Food of the Russian Federation. The tasks assigned to it were not implemented in any full measure. On the fact of embezzlement of funds allocated by the state for the operation of the company, the General Prosecutor's Office opened a criminal case.
   In September 1997, the Federal Food Corporationwas liquidated, and its functions were transferred to the Federal State Unitary Enterprise "Federal Agency for Regulation of the Food Market" newly created under the Ministry of Agriculture and Food of the Russian Federation. Already during this period, the agency focused as much as possible on the grain market, paying little attention to other segments of the food market.
   On March 21, 2007 FSUE was reorganized into OJSC "Agency for Food Market Regulation".
   In 2009, OJSC changed its name to OJSC "United Grain Company". Subsequently, the state carried out a partial privatization of the company, retaining a controlling stake - 50% plus one share.

World grain market conjuncture

Russian grain exports/imports structure

Logistics - storage and transport

See also 
 Soviet grain exports

References

Grain trade
Foreign trade of Russia
Agriculture in Russia